Metasinopa ("next to Sinopa") is a genus of teratodontine hyaenodont that lived during the early Oligocene in Egypt (northern Africa).

Taxonomy
Although Metasinopa fraasi is the only unambiguous species of the genus, the early Miocene species Metasinopa napaki from Uganda was originally assigned to Metasinopa by Savage (1965), but was later moved to Paracynohyaenodon by van Valen (1967), and is now assigned to the Miocene Anasinopa, as A. napaki. "Sinopa" ethiopica has been assigned to Metasinopa following Savage (1965), but may be its own genus considering its younger age relative to M. fraasi.

Phylogeny
The phylogenetic relationships of genus Metasinopa are shown in the following cladogram:

See also
 Mammal classification
 Teratodontidae

References

Hyaenodonts
Oligocene mammals of Africa
Prehistoric placental genera